Linda R. Greenstein (born June 7, 1950) is an American attorney and politician who has served since 2010 as a member of the New Jersey Senate representing the 14th legislative district. She previously served in the General Assembly from 2000 to 2010.

Early life and education 
Greenstein was born in the New York City borough of Brooklyn and graduated from Andrew Jackson High School in Queens. She received an A.B. from Vassar College in Psychology in 1971, an M.A. in 1974 from Johns Hopkins University and was awarded a J.D. in 1984 from the Georgetown University Law Center.

Career

Early career 
She was a Clinical Associate Professor at the Seton Hall University School of Law, where she supervised the Disability Law Clinic. She has served as a Deputy Attorney General in Trenton and as an Assistant District Attorney in Philadelphia.

Greenstein served on the Plainsboro Township Committee from 1995 to 2000 and on the West Windsor-Plainsboro Regional School District's Board of Education from 1992 to 1994. Prior to her election to the General Assembly, she was a Senior Staff Attorney at the Community Health Law Project and supervised the Public Interest Legal Clinic at Montclair State University.

New Jersey Assembly 
In the 1999 Assembly election, Republican incumbents Paul Kramer and Barbara Wright were narrowly defeated by Democrats Greenstein and Gary Guear, with the incumbents losing votes in Hamilton Township, where Democrat Glen Gilmore won the race for mayor. The two gains were among the three Republicans seats Democrats picked up in the Assembly in the 1999 elections, though the Republicans retained their majority. She served in the Assembly for five terms from 2000 through 2010. She was the Assembly's Assistant Majority Leader from 2002, and the Deputy Speaker from 2006 to 2010. Greenstein served in the Assembly on the Judiciary Committee (as Chair) and the Health and Senior Services Committee. Greenstein was reelected in 2007 while participating in the New Jersey Clean Elections public funding program. During this campaign, Greenstein faced radio attack ads from a national third-party conservative group with ties to President George W. Bush.

2008 presidential campaign 
In 2008, Greenstein initially attempted to serve as a delegate for the Hillary Clinton campaign, but the Clinton campaign declined to nominate her. Greenstein endorsed Barack Obama's presidential campaign prior to the 2008 Iowa caucus. Greenstein worked as a campaign surrogate prior to the June primary and served as an Obama delegate to 2008 Democratic National Convention in Denver, Colorado.

New Jersey Senate 
In the 2010 special Senate election to fill the remainder of Bill Baroni's term, Greenstein ran unopposed in the Democratic primary. She defeated appointed incumbent Senator Tom Goodwin, one of her opponents from the 2009 Assembly race.

In 2011, Greenstein was re-elected over challenger Richard Kanka, father of murder victim Megan Kanka and driver behind Megan's Law.

In 2013, Greenstein faced former State Senator Peter Inverso, who represented the district from 1992 to 2008. Greenstein was re-elected to a second full term by 1,484 votes, the closest Senate margin in New Jersey that year.

In 2017, her opponent was Hamilton Township Councilwoman Ileana Schirmer. Greenstein defeated Schirmer 56.3% to 43.7%.

Committees 
Law and Public Safety
Environment and Energy
Joint Committee on the Public Schools
Budget and Appropriations
Labor
Intergovernmental Relations Commission
Legislative Services Commission

District 14 
Each of the 40 districts in the New Jersey Legislature has one representative in the New Jersey Senate and two members in the New Jersey General Assembly. The representatives from the 14th District for the 2022—23 Legislative Session are:
 Senator Linda R. Greenstein (D)
 Assemblyman Daniel R. Benson (D)
 Assemblyman Wayne DeAngelo (D)

2014 congressional election 
In 2014, 12th congressional district Representative Rush D. Holt, Jr. announced his retirement from Congress. Greenstein announced that she would seek the Democratic nomination for the seat the same day of Holt's announcement.

Of the four counties in the district, she only received the county committee endorsement from her home county of Middlesex. After Assemblywoman Bonnie Watson Coleman received the Mercer County endorsement on March 22, Greenstein was recorded telling local county Democratic leaders, "I hate everybody in here. Everybody in here is my enemy – except for the people from Hamilton. The rest of you are my enemies." Her campaign responded to the leak with a statement saying, "This thinly veiled attempt at intimidation from unnamed party bosses unfortunately reeks of the kind of sexism successful women have had to contend with throughout history." Mercer County Democratic Party chairwoman Elizabeth Maher Muoio refuted this claim, saying "Clearly, the results were not what she had hoped for, but to blame them on sexism or on a closed process is deceptive, untrue and insulting."

In the Democratic primary held on June 3, Watson Coleman defeated Greenstein, Assemblyman Upendra J. Chivukula and scientist Andrew Zwicker.

Personal life 
She is a resident of Plainsboro Township, and had one son Evan, with her husband Michael Greenstein. Michael Greenstein died on November 1, 2017.

Electoral history

United States House of Representatives

New Jersey Senate

New Jersey Assembly

References

External links
Senator Greenstein's legislative web page, New Jersey Legislature
New Jersey Legislature financial disclosure forms - 2011 2010 2009 2008 2007 2006 2005 2004
Linda R. Greenstein, Project Vote Smart

1950 births
Living people
Georgetown University Law Center alumni
Johns Hopkins University alumni
Democratic Party New Jersey state senators
New Jersey city council members
Democratic Party members of the New Jersey General Assembly
New Jersey lawyers
People from Brooklyn
People from Plainsboro Township, New Jersey
Politicians from Mercer County, New Jersey
Seton Hall University faculty
Vassar College alumni
Women state legislators in New Jersey
Women city councillors in New Jersey
21st-century American politicians
21st-century American women politicians
Andrew Jackson High School (Queens) alumni
American women academics